Heinrich August Georg Schiøtt (17 December 1823 – 25 June 1895) was a Danish portrait painter.

Biography
August Schiøtt was born in  Helsingør, Denmark. He was the son of Heinrich Erpecum Schiøtt and Anna Sophie Marie Fleron.
His father was a customs official. After his confirmation, he was sent to school in Copenhagen where he later entered the Royal Danish Academy of Fine Arts and had an undistinguished academic record. For a short time, he was a private student of Christoffer Wilhelm Eckersberg. His first portrait (of a child) was created in 1844, two years before his graduation. After that, he painted six to eight portraits every year.

Altogether, he presented over 150 portraits at the Charlottenborg Spring Exhibition, including several of the Royal Family: Caroline Amalie of Augustenburg (three times), Prince Ferdinand, Princess Caroline and Prince (later King) Christian. In addition to these portraits, his most notable include those of Baron Carl Frederik Blixen-Finecke, who was the grandfather-in-law of Karen Blixen, General Gerhard Christoph von Krogh, and the history painter J.L. Lund.

He was married in 1850, to Betty Augusta Ultima Søth (1820-1853), but she wife died three years later, after they returned from an Academy supported study trip to France, England and Italy. In 1854, he was named a member of the Academy. He remarried in 1855, to Mariane Ogilvie (1836-1857) and, in 1866, became a titular professor.

In 1872, he received ""; a grant for composers, writers and artists. This enabled him to visit Southern Europe, Egypt and Palestine where he made numerous sketches of people and landscapes.
In addition to his portraits, he created numerous figure compositions, such as King Wermund with his son Offa, Christ at Gethsemane and genre scenes of peasant life.

He was awarded the Order of the Dannebrog in 1880. He died at  Hellebæk in 1895 and was buried at Garrison Cemetery, Copenhagen.

One of his children, Elisabeth Schiøtt (1856-1893), studied with P.S. Krøyer and Laurits Tuxen and became a landscape painter. In 1938, an auction of his and his daughter's remaining works was held at the Academy and the proceeds were used to establish a scholarship.

References

External links 

ArtNet: More works by Schiøtt.

1823 births
1895 deaths
19th-century Danish painters
Danish male painters
Danish portrait painters
People from Helsingør
Royal Danish Academy of Fine Arts alumni
Academic staff of the Royal Danish Academy of Fine Arts
Knights of the Order of the Dannebrog
Burials at the Garrison Cemetery, Copenhagen
19th-century Danish male artists